Michael Lamey (born 29 November 1979) is a Dutch former professional footballer who played as a right back.

Playing career 
Born in Amsterdam, Lamey began his professional career with RKC Waalwijk, before making moves to PSV Eindhoven, MSV Duisburg and Arminia Bielefeld. After his transfer from PSV to Duisburg, the two teams played in a pre-season friendly and Lamey scored an own goal in favour of his previous team. The club was relegated at the end of his first season. He left Arminia Bielefeld at the end of the 2009–10 season following their failure to regain instant promotion back to the German Bundesliga.

On 9 August 2010, Lamey joined Leicester City after impressing the club in a two-week trial. On 11 August, he was part of the reserves squad that won the Totesport.com Cup in a 2–1 win over Oldham Athletic reserves at Quorn FC. After an unsuccessful year with only seven league appearances, he moved to Wisła Kraków in July 2011.  At the end of the season, his contract was not extended, leaving him without a club for a few months.

In October 2012, Lamey returned to the Netherlands and signed a three-year contract with his former club RKC Waalwijk in the Eredivisie until the end of June 2015.

Managerial career
After his retirement in 2014, Lamey pursued a career in coaching. In 2018, he began working as a coach in the youth department of FC Eindhoven. The following year, he was promoted to manager of Jong FC Eindhoven, the second team of the club. He was dismissed from the position in January 2020, and replaced by Eric Addo.

Personal life 
His mother is Nigerian.

Honours
Utrecht
 KNVB Cup: 2003–04

References

External links 
 Voetbal International profile 
 

1979 births
Living people
Association football fullbacks
Expatriate footballers in England
Expatriate footballers in Germany
Expatriate footballers in Poland
Dutch footballers
Dutch expatriate footballers
RKC Waalwijk players
PSV Eindhoven players
AZ Alkmaar players
FC Utrecht players
MSV Duisburg players
Arminia Bielefeld players
Wisła Kraków players
Leicester City F.C. players
Bundesliga players
2. Bundesliga players
Eredivisie players
English Football League players
Ekstraklasa players
Footballers from Amsterdam
Dutch people of Nigerian descent